Kojo-Aryk is a village in Nookat District of Osh Region of Kyrgyzstan. Its population was 5,474 in 2021.

Population

References

Populated places in Osh Region